Flag families are sets of national flags with similarities in their design, often based on a shared history, culture, or influence. Families do not include flags with coincidental similarities. Flags may be in multiple flag families. Only twelve current national flags existed before the 19th century, when large-scale flag use began. Seven of these flags (Denmark, France, the Netherlands, Russia, Turkey, the United Kingdom, and the United States of America) are the inspiration for more than 130 current national flags and ensigns.

Christian cross 

A Christian cross flag is any flag with a cross or crosses as a central element of its design (as opposed to flags like those of Malta and Serbia, which use crosses as smaller embellishments). It is the oldest flag family. The first flag purported to have such a cross was the flag of Portugal, beginning in around 1100. The flag design became the most common design for merchant ships across Europe for several centuries. Flags in this family use different types of crosses, including the Latin cross (†), the Greek cross (✚), and the Maltese cross (✠). (The Maltese cross does not appear on Malta's national flag, only its civil ensign.)

Nordic cross 

Flags in the Nordic cross family feature crosses stretching the width and length of the flag, with the center offset to hoist. The cross design represents Christianity, Denmark was the first to adopt this design in the 14th century. As the oldest national flag in continuous use, the flag of Denmark served as inspiration for other Nordic countries as they adopted theirs. Though the design is strongly associated with Nordic countries, cities and territories outside the region use this design. Greenland is the only Nordic region that does not use the Nordic cross.

Crescent 

Flags with crescents are recorded as being used in the region of Middle East and North Africa as early as the 14th century. These designs often featured a white crescent open toward the top on a solid-colored field. During the 19th century when national flags became common, Turkey was the only Muslim state considered a world power. Its flag popularized the crescent design for other Muslim nations when they later adopted flags. Most Muslim crescent flags also have one or more stars near or within the circle formed by the crescent. The crescent on the flag of non-Muslim Singapore represents "a young nation on the ascendant".

British Ensign 

The British Ensign family is composed of flags with the Union Jack in the canton. The Union Flag adopted in 1606 combined the Saint George's Cross of England and the St. Andrew's saltire of Scotland to form the Union Flag. The Saint Patrick's saltire was added to the flag in 1801. In the mid-19th Century, the British government declared the use of a white ensign for use by the Royal Navy, a red ensign for non-government vessels, and a blue ensign for all vessels "belonging to, or permanently in, the service of the Colonies." As the British Empire expanded, so too did the use of variations of the ensigns, especially the blue ensign. Of the original fifty-three independent nations in the British Commonwealth, all but four had the Union Jack on their flag. Forty-four have removed the Union Jack from their flags.

Stars and Stripes 

The stars and stripes flag family is composed of flags of alternating stripes with a field in the hoist (often the canton) charged with an emblem (often, but not always, a star or stars). Early versions of the flag of the United States were based on ensigns of the United Kingdom, with the Union Flag on the canton. Instead of a solid-colored field, they had stripes inspired by the flag of the East India Company. In 1777, the Continental Congress of the United States resolved to replace the Union Flag with thirteen stars. The first nation to adopt a similar flag was the Hawaiian Kingdom, and many other nations wanting to express ideals of liberty and democracy followed suit.

Dutch and pan-Slavic colors 

Dutch and pan-Slavic colors are a family of flags, usually with red, white, and blue stripes, inspired by the Dutch and later Russian flags. The first flag of simple stripes were the livery colors of William I, Prince of Orange, used in the mid-16th century. These stripes of orange, white, and blue became the first flag of the Netherlands. In the 17th century, the orange was replaced by red. Tsar Peter the Great personally designed a merchant flag of Russia based on the colors of the flag of the Netherlands. The Russian flag, in turn, inspired many flags of countries in the Slavic region. Most retained the white, blue and red, but Bulgaria changed the blue stripe in the flag of Russia to a green stripe.

Tricolours and tribands 

A tricolor is any flag following the flag of France in its design of three vertical stripes of equal width, each distinct in color. On the eve of the French Revolution, 13 July 1789, red and blue cockades were given to the militia of Paris. Soon afterward, Louis XVI added one to his royal white cockade. These colors, arranged as stripes, became the flag of France in 1794. In this way, vertical tribands of three colors became associated with movements for republicanism and were adopted by many nations transitioning to republican governance. Unlike tricolour, the triband design may contain two identical colors, such as flags of Nigeria and Peru.

Pan-African 

Flags in the pan-African family use a combination of some or all of the colors red, yellow, green, and black. Some pan-African flags also have white and, less commonly, blue, but these are not considered pan-African colors. The design of flags in this family vary considerably. The colors red, yellow, and green became associated with pan-African colors through the Ethiopian flag. Black was later added by Marcus Garvey, an activist and organizer for the first black unification movement in the United States. Inspired by the pan-African colors' growing association with post-colonial independence, many countries in the Caribbean and the Guianas with large populations in the African diaspora also adopted pan-African colors.

Ethiopian flag family 
The colors green, yellow, and red have been historically important in Ethiopia since the early 17th century. Along with Liberia, Ethiopia was the only currently existing nation to avoid European colonization during the scramble for Africa. Its flag, therefore, was the inspiration for many countries that gained independence after colonization. The modern flags of Bolivia, Lithuania and Myanmar also use these three colors, but their origins are unrelated to the Ethiopian flag.

Marcus Garvey flag family 

Marcus Garvey inspired two independent sets of national African flags. In 1917, he proposed a red, black, and green flag for his organization, known as the Universal Negro Improvement Association and African Communities League. According to Garvey,

These three colors were the inspiration behind the flag of Kenya, the flag of Malawi, the Flag of South Sudan and other historic flags such as the flag of Biafra. Independently, Marcus Garvey also created the Black Star Line, a shipping company between the United States and West Africa that transported many African-Americans to Africa and vice versa. The eponymous black star of the house flag of the company later became a part of three national flags in West Africa, starting with the flag of Ghana designed by Theodosia Okoh.

Pan-Arab colors 

The pan-Arab flag family is a set of flags featuring three or four of the colors red, black, white, and green. The flags have three horizontal stripes, often with an emblem in the center or an overlapping shape in the hoist. According to biographers of Muhammad, he used both flags of white and flags of black. Each color of the pan-Arab flags is associated with a caliphate of Islam. White and black flags were used by the Umayyad and Abbasid dynasties respectively. Although green is often identified as the color of the Fatimid dynasty by vexillological sources, that is not correct: their dynastic color was white. Green is now considered the color of Islam. Red was the color of the Hashemites. These colors were also described by the 14th-century poet Safi al-Din al-Hilli: "White are our deeds, black are our battles, green are our ranches, red are our swords."

In 1911, members of a Turkish literary club chose these four colors as the colors of the modern Arabic flag. The colors were combined in the flag of the Arab Revolt in 1916, and many countries adopted these colors as the colors of their national flags upon gaining independence from the Ottoman Empire at the end of World War I.

Iranian colors 

Iran adopted a flag with green, white, and red stripes in the mid-19th century. The flag has undergone changes since, but the three stripes remain. When the newly-independent republic of Tajikistan changed its flag from its former Soviet version, it chose to use the same stripes in reverse order as a nod to its close cultural ties with neighbouring Iran. The flag of Kurdistan, a geo-cultural region overlapping with Iran, uses the green-white-red stripes of the Iran flag charged with a yellow sun.

Gran Colombia 

The Gran Colombia flag family is made up of flags of countries in the former area of Gran Colombia. They have three horizontal stripes of yellow, blue, and red. Venezuelan revolutionary Francisco de Miranda personally designed the flag of Gran Colombia, a historic state that included modern Colombia, Ecuador, Panama, Venezuela, and parts of Brazil, and Guyana. The flag of Gran Colombia had three colours symbolizing Americas (yellow), the Atlantic Ocean (blue), and "bloody Spain" (red). Miranda contributed the inspiration for these colors to a late-night conversation with the German writer and color theorist Johann Wolfgang von Goethe, who is described as saying

The flag of Gran Colombia was first hoisted in 1806. It led to the current designs of Colombia, Ecuador, and Venezuela.

Belgrano 

The Belgrano flag family is composed of flags of Central and South America with blue and white stripes. In 1812, the Argentine revolutionary general Manuel Belgrano raised a flag in Rosario, Argentina, of three horizontal stripes of blue-white-blue. It was formally adopted by the Government of Argentina in 1816. Six years later, commander-general of San Salvador Manuel José Arce selected the "Argentinian colours of Belgrano" as the national flag of the province, becoming the first additional flag of the family. Building on this, the flag of the Federal Republic of Central America had blue and white stripes, and all of the countries that were once part of that republic retain those stripes in some way in their flags. El Salvador and Nicaragua have also retained the triangular emblem of the former republic; the flag of Costa Rica has an additional red stripe. Argentina's and Uruguay's flags now have the Sol de Mayo.

Red banner 

The red banner flag family is the family of flags that use large red fields or red stars as symbols of communism. The color red became associated with revolution when it was adopted by the Jacobins during the early days of the French Revolution as a symbol of their willingness to shed blood for their cause. After being used by the Paris Commune in 1871, the color became closely associated with socialism. The Bolsheviks used these flags as inspiration during the Russian Revolution, adopting the flag of the Soviet Union upon their victory in 1922. As a result, the color red became more closely associated with communism than socialism. The flag also featured a hammer and sickle and a red star fimbriated by gold, two symbols that also became closely associated with communism. As communism spread during the 20th Century, many countries, especially in Asia and Africa, adopted red flags and stars to symbolize their support for the political movement. Every former Soviet state once flew red banners. All but Belarus, which simply removed the traditional communist hammer and sickle, has adopted a different flag since the fall of the Soviet Union. Similarly, the current flag of Mongolia removed the communist star from its flag in 1992, but kept all of the other elements.

Trucial States 

Trucial State flags are a flag family from the southern and eastern coasts of the Persian Gulf. They consist of red flags with white stripes, cantons, or borders. Red is a traditional color of the Kharijite Muslims who lived in this region, and they historically used all-red banners. It was the British who added the white to the flags of the region. When the region became a British protectorate in 1820, the treaty drafted by the United Kingdom said

Instead of borders, most of the states adopted a stripe. Nearly all of these states are now member emirates of the United Arab Emirates. While the flag of the United Arab Emirates is not a Trucial States flag, the flags of the individual member emirates still are. In the 1930s, the independent countries within the Trucial State flag family, Bahrain and Qatar, both adopted serrated edges from their earlier straight-edge designs. The flag of Qatar is unique in the Trucial State flag family for having a darker shade of red or maroon, a color made using traditional shell-based dye from the area.

United Nations 

The United Nations flag family includes the flag of the United Nations and subsequent flags that borrowed design elements from the flag including the colors, symbols, or both. The UN adopted its emblem and flag in 1947. The flag came to represent the neutrality and cooperation of the UN, so similar flags are often adopted for regions in states of conflict or instability. The first such national flag was the flag of Eritrea from 1952 to 1962, which symbolized peace between the Christians and Muslims in the newly-formed country. The current Eritrean national flag, adopted in 1993, has less of the UN blue, but still retains the UN olive branches from the first design. The flag of Cyprus, adopted 1960, has no UN blue, but has the laurel wreath and a map as the central emblem. Most national flags inspired by the UN's were flags of United Nations trust territories, colonies that transitioned to independence with support and administration from the UN. These include the flag of the Trust Territory of the Pacific Islands (which later inspired the flags of Micronesia and the Northern Mariana Islands) the flag of the Trust Territory of Somaliland (which is the design of the current flag of Somalia), and the Flag of the United Nations Transitional Authority in Cambodia (which was replaced by the current flag of Cambodia that is not in the UN flag family).

References 

 
Grouping
National symbols
Vexillology